Landscape is a 2000 Slovak film directed by Martin Šulík. It was Slovakia's submission to the 73rd Academy Awards for the Academy Award for Best Foreign Language Film, but was not accepted as a nominee. Its film score, by Vladimír Godár, won the Georges Delerue Award at the Film Fest Gent festival in 2001.

See also
Cinema of Slovakia
List of submissions to the 73rd Academy Awards for Best Foreign Language Film

References

External links

2000 films
2000 drama films
Slovak black-and-white films
Films directed by Martin Šulík
Slovak-language films
Georges Delerue Award winners
Slovak drama films